The House of Lords Act 1999 (c. 34) is an Act of the Parliament of the United Kingdom that reformed the House of Lords, one of the chambers of Parliament. The Act was given Royal Assent on 11 November 1999. For centuries, the House of Lords had included several hundred members who inherited their seats (hereditary peers); the Act removed such a right. However, as part of a compromise, the Act did permit ninety-two hereditary peers to remain in the House on an interim basis. Another ten were created life peers to enable them to remain in the House.

The Act decreased the membership of the House from 1,330 in October 1999 to 669 in March 2000. As another result of the Act, the majority of the Lords were now life peers, whose numbers had been gradually increasing since the Life Peerages Act 1958. As of November 2019, there were 793 members of the House of Lords, of whom 26 were senior Church of England bishops, whose representation in the House is governed by the Bishoprics Act 1878.

Background
Prior to the 16th century, the Lords was the more powerful of the two houses of Parliament. A series of developments, including such moments of crisis as the English Civil War, gradually shifted the political control of England, first from the Crown to the House of Lords and then to the House of Commons. The rising wealth of the Commons eventually allowed it to wage two civil wars, dethrone two kings, and gradually reduce the power of the Lords. Prior to the House of Lords Act 1999, the power of the Lords had been diminished by the Parliament Acts 1911 and 1949 which stripped the Lords of the ability to block, or veto, adoption of most bills; at most it could delay bills for one year. Furthermore, the Commons has absolute power when it comes to money bills.

After eighteen years of Conservative government, the Labour party led by Tony Blair won a landslide victory at the 1997 general election, inflicting the biggest defeat for the Conservatives since 1832. The Labour Party had for years endorsed abolition of the House of Lords in its election platforms, though since 1992 this had changed to a policy of reforming the House instead of such a drastic constitutional change.

During the 20th century, Liberal and Labour governments proposed many bills that were opposed by the House of Lords, which had been dominated by Conservatives since the 1890s, leading to some delay and, where proposed before elections, their dropping from the legislative agenda. In the first year of the Blair government, the Lords passed back Government bills 38 times. The rejection considered the most contentious was that of the European Elections Bill, against which the Lords voted five times. Blair stated that the Conservatives were using the hereditary peers to "frustrate" and "overturn the will of the democratically elected House of Commons". Here Blair found an opportunity to implement one of Labour's campaign promises, reforming the Lords.

On 24 November 1998, in opening the second session of Parliament, the Queen delivered her annual Speech from the Throne; the Speech is written for her by the ruling party and outlines that party's legislative agenda for the forthcoming year. In it, she stated that her Government (i.e. the ruling Labour Party) would pursue a reform of the House of Lords. These remarks were followed by shouts of "Hear! Hear!" from supportive Labour Members of Parliament, which led to similar shouts of "Shame! Shame!" from Conservative peers; such outbursts were unprecedented, for the Queen's Speech is with few exceptions heard by a silent Parliament.

Bill
The House of Lords Bill was expected to face a tough fight in the House of Lords. Several Lords threatened to disrupt the Government's other bills if they continued with the plan to abolish the hereditaries' right to sit in the House of Lords. The Earl of Onslow, for instance, said, "I'm happy to force a division on each and every clause of the Scotland Bill. Each division takes 20 minutes and there are more than 270 clauses."

Lord Randall of St Budeaux put forward the idea of phasing out the hereditary peers by disqualifying their heirs.

Baroness Jay of Paddington reminded the House that under the Salisbury Convention they could not block the bill.

In order to convince some peers to vote for reform, Tony Blair announced that he would compromise by allowing a number of hereditary peers to remain in the House of Lords on an interim basis. On 2 December 1998, the Conservative Leader of the Opposition, William Hague, rose in the House of Commons to attack Blair's plans. He suggested that Blair's changes indicated his lack of principles, claiming that Blair wanted to turn the House of Lords into a "House of Cronies". Hague further suggested that the Conservative Party would never agree to such constitutional reforms that were "based on no comprehensive plan or principle." Hague's remarks backfired when Blair revealed that the Conservative Party in the House of Lords, rather than oppose his reforms, would definitely support them, and that he had done a secret deal with the Conservative leader in the House of Lords, Viscount Cranborne. Hague immediately removed Cranborne from office, but, in protest, several Conservative Lords who held front-bench positions resigned.

On 19 January 1999, the Leader of the House of Commons, Margaret Beckett, introduced the House of Lords Bill into the House of Commons. The House of Commons passed the bill by a vote of 340 to 132 on 16 March. The next day it was presented to the House of Lords, where debate on the bill was far longer. One significant amendment made to the Bill was the so-called Weatherill Amendment, named for Lord Weatherill, the former Speaker of the House of Commons. The Weatherill Amendment put into place the deal agreed to by the Prime Minister and Viscount Cranborne, and allowed 92 hereditary peers to remain members of the House of Lords.

Several controversies relating to the technicalities of the bill were brought up in the House of Lords. One issue regarded the language used in clauses 1 to 7, which was described by Lord Mayhew of Twysden as "uncertain in its effects and would leave the position of most hereditary Peers uncertain if the Bill was enacted." A second issue was related to the Acts of Union 1707 uniting Scotland and England into the Kingdom of Great Britain. After lengthy debates, both matters were referred to the House of Lords Committee on Privileges.

Under the Acts of Union 1707, Scottish Lords would be entitled to elect 16 representative peers to sit on their Lordships' behalf in the House of Lords. In 1963, the Peerage Act was passed, allowing all Scottish peers to sit in the House, not just 16 of them. It was felt that removing all Scottish representation would breach the Articles. The Government, however, responded that the Articles did envisage a change in the election of representative peers. It was argued that some portions of the Treaty were entrenched, while others were not. For instance, Scotland and England were united "forever," the Scottish Court of Session was to "remain in all time coming within Scotland as it is now constituted," and the establishment of the Church of Scotland was "effectually and unalterably secured." However, it was suggested, the election of Scottish representative peers was not entrenched, and therefore could be amended. Furthermore, the Government argued that Parliament was entirely sovereign and supreme, and could at its will change the Articles of Union. For example, the Treaty of Union joining Great Britain and Ireland required that the two nations be united "forever". Nonetheless, in 1922, by an Act of Parliament, most of Ireland was made independent as the Irish Free State. Thus, even entrenched clauses were argued to be open to amendment by the authority of Parliament. The Committee agreed and reported to the House on 20 October 1999 that the Bill was indeed lawful in this regard.

After the Committee's first and second reports were considered, the Lords passed the bill 221 to 81 on 26 October 1999. During the session, the Earl of Burford, son of the Duke of St Albans, launched a protest at the constitutional implications of the bill from the Woolsack, and was ejected from the chamber. Once the Lords settled the differences between their version of the bill and the Commons version, the Bill received Royal Assent on 11 November 1999 and became an Act of Parliament. The Act came into force the same day.

Membership of the House of Lords
The House of Lords Act 1999 first provides that "No-one shall be a member of the House of Lords by virtue of a hereditary peerage." (The Act treats the Principality of Wales and the Earldom of Chester as hereditary peerages, though those titles, granted normally to the heir apparent, are not technically hereditary.) The Act then provides that 92 peers, including the Earl Marshal, the Lord Great Chamberlain and 90 other peers elected in accordance with the Standing Orders of the House, would be excepted from the exclusion of hereditary peers, and that after the first session of the next Parliament, whenever one of those seats fell vacant, the Lords would have to proceed to a by-election. The Act also provided that a hereditary peer would be entitled to vote in elections for, and sit in, the House of Commons, unless he or she was a member of the House of Lords. Previously, hereditary peers had been constitutionally disqualified from being electors to, or members of, the House of Commons. The first hereditary peer to gain a seat in the Commons under this provision was John Thurso.

The Act prevents even hereditary peers who are the first to hold their titles from sitting automatically in the House of Lords. But the Government gave life peerages (the titles of which are indicated in parentheses) to all three living non-royal hereditary peers of first creation, (Low, Erroll and Pakenham were the only living non-royal hereditary peers of first creation as of November 1999, see the lists of hereditary peerages) and also offered life peerages to the royal peers (of whom only the Earl of Snowdon accepted):

Additionally, life peerages were created for all former living Leaders of the House of Lords who were Hereditary Peers (Quintin Hogg already held a life peerage since 1970): 

William Whitelaw, 1st Viscount Whitelaw died on 1 July 1999; had he lived he would have been eligible as a former Leader of the House of Lords 1983–1988 and as a first holder of his hereditary peerage.

The following Hereditary Peers who had been created Life Peers remained in the House after the Act was passed, they were:

Life peerages were also offered to members of the royal family with new hereditary peerages, but were declined, as this would have meant they would continue to hold seats in the reformed House of Lords: Prince Philip, Duke of Edinburgh; Prince Charles, Duke of Cornwall and Rothesay; Prince Andrew, Duke of York; and Prince Edward, Earl of Wessex. The Duke of Gloucester and Duke of Kent had both inherited their peerages from their fathers, the first dukes, and were not treated differently from other hereditary peers.

First election to the House of Lords

Before the granting of Royal Assent, the Lords had adopted a Standing Order making provision for the election of those hereditary peers who would remain members of the House under section 2 of the Act. The Order provided that there be elected:
 two peers by the Labour hereditary peers
 three peers by the Liberal Democrat hereditary peers
 28 peers by the Crossbench hereditary peers
 42 peers by the Conservative hereditary peers
 15 peers, ready to serve as Deputy Speakers and in other offices, by the whole House of Lords

The elections for officers of the House were held on 27 and 28 October 1999, while those for peers elected by party were held on 3 and 4 November; the results were proclaimed to the House on 29 October and 5 November. Voters were required to rank in order of preference, on a ballot prepared by the Clerk of the Parliaments, as many candidates as there were places to be filled. The candidates receiving the greatest number of votes (without regard to the ranking on the ballots, so in effect block voting) were declared elected. Only if there were ties would the ranking be examined. Thereafter, until November 2002, if a vacancy occurred, the next-highest placed unsuccessful candidate in the original election (the rankings being examined, again, only in the case of ties) would fill the seat. This procedure was used on two occasions, in October 2000 and September 2001.

Subsequent by-elections

Since November 2002, by-elections have been held to fill vacancies. Two by-elections were held in 2003, one in 2004, four in 2005, one in each of 2007, 2008 and 2009, two in 2010, four in 2011, two in 2013, four in 2014, six in 2015, two in 2016, two in 2017, three in 2018 and two in 2019. Voting is by preferential voting, with peers ranking the candidates in order of preference. As many or as few preferences as desired may be indicated. To win the election, a peer must receive at least one half of the available votes. If no candidate receives this number of first preference votes, the candidate with the fewest first preference votes is eliminated, with each of their votes being redistributed according to the second preference marked on the ballot (see Instant-runoff voting). The process is continued until one candidate receives at least one half of the remaining votes.

Post-1999 reform proposals

Labour proposals to remove remaining hereditary peers (until 2009) 
The Labour Government expected eventually to present a bill for a second stage of House of Lords reform, thus removing the remaining 92 hereditary peers; the history of such attempts between 1997 and 2009 is set out in a report in The Guardian. Proposals called The House of Lords: Reform were published by order of the House on 1 January 2007, with a foreword by Jack Straw. In 2009, Labour introduced the Constitutional Reform and Governance Bill, which would have ended the by-elections to fill vacancies for hereditary peers, thereby removing them through attrition. However, in order to ensure the passage of the bill through Parliament before the 2010 general election, this clause was dropped from the bill entirely, along with other clauses relating to the exclusion and suspension of peers from the House of Lords.

2012 coalition bill electing all Lords and halving their number 

The coalition government of David Cameron (Conservatives) and Nick Clegg (Liberal Democrats), inaugurated in 2010, had plans to reform the House of Lords by making it mostly elected and slashing its size. Deputy Prime Minister and Liberal Democrat leader Nick Clegg spearheaded the push to bring in the changes. The government wanted four-fifths of members of a reformed House of Lords to be elected. They would have served 15-year terms of office, after which they could not run for re-election. The number of peers was to be almost halved, from 826 to 450. The chamber would have kept the title of House of Lords, after names like Senate and Reformed House were rejected.  Peers were each to represent a specific region of the United Kingdom, as constituted for the election of Members of the European Parliament. One-third of seats would have been filled by elections held every five years.  Of the remaining 90 members, 12—rather than the current 26—would have been Church of England bishops. The remainder were to continue to be appointed, and all hereditary peers were to be removed. The government had scheduled passage of its bill for the spring of 2013, and the elections were to have taken place in 2015, but the effort stalled when in July 2012, 91 Conservatives in the Commons rebelled against the government in a vote on how to timetable the House of Lords Reform Bill. In August 2012, the coalition's plans were dropped.

2014 and 2015 reform acts 
The House of Lords Reform Act 2014 allowed peers to retire or resign, to be excluded for serious criminal offences, or to be removed for non-attendance during a whole session. The Lords Spiritual (Women) Act 2015 allowed female bishops to be appointed Lord Spiritual, which first happened on 7 September 2015. The House of Lords (Expulsion and Suspension) Act 2015 authorised the House of Lords to expel or suspend a member for serious misconduct; expelled members are permanently barred from returning to the House.

2016 bill to phase out hereditary peers 
A bill proposed by Labour peer Lord Grocott to abolish by-elections (and therefore phase out hereditary peers) was filibustered in 2016 by Conservative hereditary peer Lord Trefgarne.

Further reading
Digital reproduction of the Original Act on the Parliamentary Archives catalogue

See also
 Reform of the House of Lords
 Roll of the Peerage
 List of hereditary peers elected under the House of Lords Act 1999
 List of hereditary peers removed under the House of Lords Act 1999

References

External links
 Home Office document from the Constitutional Unit Annex B lists the hereditary peers who lost their seats.

United Kingdom Acts of Parliament 1999
Constitutional laws of the United Kingdom
Acts of the Parliament of the United Kingdom concerning the House of Lords
Political history of the United Kingdom
November 1999 events in the United Kingdom